Tori may refer to:

Places 
 Tori (Georgia), an historic province of the nation of Georgia
 Tori Parish, Pärnu County, Estonia
 Tori, Estonia
 Tori, Ghana, a village in the kingdom of Chumburung, Ghana
 Tori, Järva County, Estonia
 Tori, Mali
 Tori Railway Station, in Chandwa, Latehar district, Jharkhand, India
 Tori-Bossito, Atlantique Department, Benin
 Tori-Cada, Atlantique Department, Benin

Other uses 
 Taiwan Ocean Research Institute (TORI), an oceanographic research organization 
 Tori (horse), a breed of horse
 Tori (journal) (1915–1986), predecessor to the Japanese Journal of Ornithology
 Tori (martial arts), the executor of a technique in partnered martial arts practice
 Tori (name), including a list of people with the name
 Tori Style, the artistic style of the Japanese Asuka period
 Tori, the plural of Torus, a kind of geometric object that includes doughnut-shaped objects
 Tori (wrestler), American bodybuilder and professional wrestler

See also 
 Mandibular tori, bony growths in the mandible
 Palatal tori, the bony growths in the palate
 Torii (disambiguation)
 Torikeskus (disambiguation), name of several shopping centres in Finland
 Torishima (disambiguation), the name of several islands in Japan
 Tory (disambiguation)